Olleya is a Gram-negative, strictly aerobic and chemoheterotrophic genus of bacteria from the family of Flavobacteriaceae. Olleya is named after the microbiologist June Olley.

References

Flavobacteria
Bacteria genera
Taxa described in 2005